The 2018–19 Marshall Thundering Herd men's basketball team represented Marshall University during the 2018–19 NCAA Division I men's basketball season. The Thundering Herd, led by fifth-year head coach Dan D'Antoni, played their home games at the Cam Henderson Center as members of Conference USA. They finished the season 23–14, 11–7 in C-USA play to finish in sixth place. They defeated Rice before losing to Southern Miss in the quarterfinals of the C-USA tournament. They were invited to the CollegeInsider.com Tournament where they defeated IUPUI, Presbyterian, Hampton and Green Bay to become CIT champions.

Previous season
The Thundering Herd finished the 2017–18 season 25–11, 12–6 in C-USA play to finish in fourth place. They defeated UTSA, Southern Miss, and Western Kentucky to become champions of the C-USA tournament. They received C-USA's automatic bid to the NCAA tournament where, as a No. 13 seed, they upset No. 4 seed Wichita State 81–75 in the first round before losing to No. 5 seed and rival West Virginia in the second round.

Offseason

Departures

Incoming transfers

2018 recruiting class

Roster

Schedule and results

|-
!colspan=12 style=| Exhibition

|-
!colspan=12 style=| Non-Conference Regular season

|-
!colspan=9 style=| Conference USA regular season

|-
!colspan=9 style=| Conference USA tournament

|-
!colspan=12 style=|CollegeInsider.com Postseason tournament
|-

References

Marshall Thundering Herd men's basketball seasons
Marshall
Marsh
Marsh
Marshall
CollegeInsider.com Postseason Tournament championship seasons